Cloppenburg is a town in Lower Saxony, Germany, capital of Cloppenburg District and part of Oldenburg Münsterland. It lies 38 km south-south-west of Oldenburg in the Weser-Ems region between Bremen and the Dutch border. Cloppenburg is not far from the A1, the major motorway connecting the Ruhr area to Bremen and Hamburg. Another major road is the federal highway B213 being the shortest link from the Netherlands to the A1 and thus to Bremen and Hamburg.

The town had strong cultural links with St  Munchins Parish in Limerick, Ireland from the 1970s to the 1990s. During this period many groups of teens/young adults from both areas visited and were hosted by families from the other area.

Economy

The town is a centre for the largely agricultural region of southern Oldenburg. It is the administrative centre of the district and there are many schools.

However, there is also some industry in town: e.g. Lumberg, (connector systems) and Derby Cycle (bikes).

Tourism

One of Cloppenburg's main tourist attractions is the Cloppenburg Museum Village, a collection of old buildings from the region that were dismantled and reassembled in the museum.

Twin town

Cloppenburg is twinned with:
 Bernay, France

Mayors
Ignatz Feigel (1855–1922)
Bernhard Heukamp (1884–1946)
Georg Wessling (1889–1974)
Wolfgang Wiese (2014–2021)
Neidhard Varnhorn (2021–incumbent)

Notable people
Fanny Moran-Olden (1855–1905), opera singer (soprano)
Georg Wessling (1889–1974), mayor of Cloppenburg and member of parliament
Werner Baumbach (1916–1953), bomber pilot in World War II
Jupp Derwall (1927–2007), football player and coach
Manfred Zapatka (born 1942), actor, graduating from the Clemens-August-Gymnasium Cloppenburg 1962
Manfred Hellmann (born 1962), footballer
Lena Gercke (born 1988), model
Bernd Gerdes (born 1989), footballer

See also
Route of Megalithic Culture

References

External links

Official website 

 
Towns in Lower Saxony
Cloppenburg (district)